Calumet Creek is a stream in Pike County in the U.S. state of Missouri. It is a tributary of the Mississippi River. The source area is about one mile east of the community of Edgewood and U.S. Route 61 and the stream flows to the northeast passing south of the community of Calumet. The stream continues to the northeast and enters the Mississippi about one mile northwest of Clarksville.

Calumet Creek derives its name from a colonial-era term for a certain type of Native American ceremonial pipe.

See also
List of rivers of Missouri

References

Rivers of Pike County, Missouri
Rivers of Missouri